The College of Engineering is a division of Cornell University that was founded in 1870 as the Sibley College of Mechanical Engineering and Mechanic Arts. It is one of four private undergraduate colleges at Cornell that are not statutory colleges.

It currently grants bachelors, masters, and doctoral degrees in a variety of engineering and applied science fields, and is the third largest undergraduate college at Cornell by student enrollment. The college offers over 450 engineering courses, and has an annual research budget exceeding US$112 million.

History

The College of Engineering was founded in 1870 as the Sibley College of Mechanical Engineering and Mechanic Arts. The program was housed in Sibley Hall on what has since become the Arts Quad, both of which are named for Hiram Sibley, the original benefactor whose contributions were used to establish the program. The college took its current name in 1919 when the Sibley College merged with the College of Civil Engineering. It was housed in Sibley, Lincoln, Franklin, Rand, and Morse Halls. In the 1950s the college moved to the southern end of Cornell's campus.

The college is known for a number of firsts. In 1889, the college took over electrical engineering from the Department of Physics, establishing the first department in the United States in this field. The college awarded the nation's first doctorates in both electrical engineering and industrial engineering. The Department of Computer Science, established in 1965 jointly under the College of Engineering and the College of Arts and Sciences, is also one of the oldest in the country.

For many years, the college offered a five-year undergraduate degree program. However, in the 1960s, the course was shortened to four years for a B.S. degree with an optional fifth year leading to a masters of engineering degree. From the 1950s to the 1970s, Cornell offered a Master of Nuclear Engineering program, with graduates gaining employment in the nuclear industry. However, after the 1979 accident at Three Mile Island, employment opportunities in that field dimmed and the program was dropped. Cornell continued to operate its on-campus nuclear reactor as a research facility following the close of the program.  For most of Cornell's history, Geology was taught in the College of Arts and Sciences. However, in the 1970s, the department was shifted to the engineering college and Snee Hall was built to house the program. After World War II, the Graduate School of Aerospace Engineering was founded as a separate academic unit, but later merged into the engineering college.

Cornell Engineering is home to many teams that compete in student design competitions and other engineering competitions. Presently, there are teams that compete in the Baja SAE, Automotive X-Prize (see Cornell 100+ MPG Team), UNP Satellite Program, DARPA Grand Challenge, AUVSI Unmanned Aerial Systems and Underwater Vehicle Competition, Formula SAE, RoboCup, Solar Decathlon, Genetically Engineered Machines, and others.

Reputation
Cornell's College of Engineering is currently ranked 12th nationally by U.S. News & World Report, making it ranked 1st among engineering schools/programs in the Ivy League. The engineering physics program at Cornell was ranked as being No. 1 by U.S. News & World Report in 2008. Cornell's operations research and industrial engineering program ranked fourth in nation, along with the master's program in financial engineering. Cornell's computer science program ranks among the top five in the world, and it ranks fourth in the quality of graduate education.

The college is a leader in nanotechnology. In a survey done by a nanotechnology magazine Cornell University was ranked as being the best at nanotechnology commercialization, 2nd best in terms of nanotechnology facilities, the 4th best at nanotechnology research and the 10th best at nanotechnology industrial outreach.

Departments and schools

With about 3,000 undergraduates and 1,300 graduate students, the college is the third-largest undergraduate college at Cornell by student enrollment. It is divided into twelve departments and schools:

School of Applied and Engineering Physics
Department of Biological and Environmental Engineering
Meinig School of Biomedical Engineering
Smith School of Chemical and Biomolecular Engineering
School of Civil & Environmental Engineering
Department of Computer Science
Department of Earth & Atmospheric Sciences
School of Electrical and Computer Engineering
Department of Materials Science and Engineering
Sibley School of Mechanical and Aerospace Engineering
School of Operations Research and Information Engineering
Department of Theoretical and Applied Mechanics
Department of Systems Engineering

The Engineering Quadrangle

 

The Engineering Quad was designed in the 1940s and 1950s on a site previously occupied by the Old Armory and faculty housing, using a master plan developed by the Perkins and Will firm. It has undergone major changes in recent years, particularly with the completion of Duffield Hall. In 2004, relandscaping with a design inspired by Cascadilla Gorge was completed and its landmark sundial was restored to its rightful place on the quad (after having been stored in Upson Hall during the construction period). In 2017, a $74.5 million renovation was completed for Upson Hall, completely revamping the building with work-friendly floors and a modern lounge. Also, modern and open collaborative working spaces were introduced with the construction of a large atrium connecting Duffield, which houses research and teaching facilities for nanoscale science and engineering, with Phillips and Upson (1956) Halls. Connected to Upson Hall, away from the quad, are Grumman Hall (1957) and Frank H. T. Rhodes Hall (1990), which currently houses the Cornell Theory Center.  On the southern end of the Quad, next to Upson Hall and near Cascadilla Creek, are Kimball Hall, Thurston Hall and Bard Hall(1963) Hall, all part of a single brick and concrete structure. Thurston is the home to the Theoretical and Applied Mechanics department, and Bard Hall the home of the Material Sciences department. Between Upson and Kimball stands Ward Hall (1963), the soon to be closed down and former building for nuclear sciences. Next to Bard, and across the street from the Cornell Law School, stand Snee Hall (1984) and Hollister Hall (1957). Carpenter Hall (1956), containing the Engineering Library, stands next to Hollister on the northwestern corner. It is one of the smallest buildings on campus and the site of a protracted anti-war building occupation in 1972. The edge of northern face of the quad, mostly open space, is lined with trees along Campus Road. Across Campus Road is Franklin W. Olin Jr. Hall (1942), home of the School of Chemical and Biomolecular Engineering.

The most recently constructed engineering building is Bill and Melinda Gates Hall which opened in 2014. The building, funded in part by a $25 million gift from the Bill and Melinda Gates Foundation, is located across Campus Road from Barton Hall and east of Phillips Hall, across Hoy Road, on the site of a parking lot for Hoy Field and Grumman Squash Courts. The building is home to the Department of Computer Science, previously located in Upson Hall, and the Department of Information Science, formerly located off campus. The 100,000 square foot building was designed by Pritzker Prize winning architect Thom Mayne.  The budgeted cost of the building was $60 million and was funded entirely from outside sources without the need for any additional debt.  Gates Hall is expected to earn at least silver LEED certification.  Occupancy of the building began in early 2014 and the building will be dedicated in October 2014.

Future developments

The College of Engineering has developed a facilities master plan that calls for replacements and renovations of buildings on the Engineering Quad as well as addressing programs housed elsewhere on the campus. Weill Hall, which opened in 2008, houses the Department of Biomedical Engineering.  A new physical sciences building between Rockefeller Hall and Baker Laboratory was completed in late 2010 and houses the School of Applied and Engineering Physics as well as space for the Departments of Physics and Chemistry.

Design has also been initiated for a new building that will replace Carpenter Hall and the north portion of Hollister Hall, providing new space for the Sibley School of Mechanical and Aerospace Engineering and for the School of Civil and Environmental Engineering.

Degrees
The College of Engineering offers 14 undergraduate majors, 20 undergraduate minors, 16 MS/PhD fields, and 15 Master of Engineering fields.  The College of Engineering grants degrees in the following programs of study.

References

External links

Engineering
Engineering
1870 establishments in New York (state)
Educational institutions established in 1870
Engineering schools and colleges in the United States
Engineering universities and colleges in New York (state)